Cotora is a Romanian surname. Notable people with the surname include:

 Florin Cotora (born 1972), Romanian footballer
 Lucian Cotora (born 1969), Romanian footballer, brother of Florin

See also
 Cotorra
 Kotora

Romanian-language surnames